Maggie Alderson (born 1959) is a London-born Australian author, magazine editor and fashion journalist. She is the former editor of ES, the Evening Standard magazine (British Society of Magazine Editors, Editor of the Year, Colour Supplements 1989) and British Elle magazines. In Australia, she was acting editor of Cleo and editor of Mode.

In 1996 she joined the Sydney Morning Herald as a Senior Writer and for many years covered the fashion shows in Paris, Milan and London for the paper. Her weekly column, on a loose fashion and style theme, appeared in Good Weekend (the Saturday magazine of the Sydney Morning Herald and The Age newspapers) for over ten years. She has also had a similar column in The Times, in the UK.

On 4 November 2010, it was announced that Alderson's column would no longer be appearing in Good Weekend.

The internationally bestselling Girls Night In "chick lit" anthology series she co-edited with author Jessica Adams and columnist Imogen Edwards-Jones made millions for the charity War Child.

She was co-editor, with Jessica Adams, Imogen Edwards-Jones and Kathy Lette, of In Bed With, a collection of erotic short stories written by leading female novelists (Fay Weldon, Joanne Harris, Ali Smith, Esther Freud, Justine Picardie, among others).

Maggie Alderson has an MA in Art History from the University of St Andrews.

She is married with one daughter.

Novels

 Pants on Fire (2000)
 Mad About the Boy (2002)
 Handbags and Gladrags (2004)
 Cents and Sensibility (2006)
 How to Break Your Own Heart (2008)
 Shall We Dance (2010)
 Evangeline: The Wish Keeper's Helper (2011)
 Everything Changes But You (2012)
 Secret Keeping for Beginners (2015)
 The Scent of You (2017)

Non-fiction

 Shoe Money (1998)
 Handbag Heaven (2001)
 Gravity Sucks (2007)
 Style Notes (2011)

References

External links
Publisher's website
 

1959 births
Living people
Alumni of the University of St Andrews
Australian freelance journalists
Australian women journalists
Australian women novelists
Australian expatriates in England
English emigrants to Australia
Writers from London
20th-century Australian novelists
20th-century Australian women writers
The Sydney Morning Herald people